David Brink (November 25, 1947 – June 29, 2019) was an American cyclist. He competed in the individual pursuit at the 1968 Summer Olympics.

References

External links
 

1947 births
2019 deaths
American male cyclists
Olympic cyclists of the United States
Cyclists at the 1968 Summer Olympics
Sportspeople from Saint Paul, Minnesota
20th-century American people